Steven McKellar is a South African musician. He is best known as the lead singer and primary songwriter for the band Civil Twilight. He performed "Nobody Can Save Me" with Linkin Park at the memorial concert for Chester Bennington at the Hollywood Bowl. In 2017, McKellar released a solo project, entitled Dayvid.

Early life
McKellar was born in Cape Town, South Africa. Growing up, his father had a substantial record collection and his mother played piano, nurturing his interest in music. Among his early influences were Jeff Buckley, Oasis, and Blur. In 1996, he began playing music with his brother Andrew and childhood friend Richard Wouters, ultimately leading to the creation of Civil Twilight.

Career
McKellar moved to Los Angeles, California in 2005, working various odd jobs before relocating to Nashville, Tennessee in 2008.
As a member of Civil Twilight, he has shared the stage with Young the Giant, Florence + the Machine, Smashing Pumpkins, Jimmy Eat World, Silversun Pickups, and Of Monsters and Men.

His music has been featured in many TV spots, including One Tree Hill, House, Star-Crossed, and Terminator: The Sarah Connor Chronicles. "Letters From The Sky" was featured at the end of Episode 11 of Harper's Island.

In 2017, McKellar played with Linkin Park at the Hollywood Bowl in Los Angeles.

McKellar released an EP of his solo work in 2017, entitled Dayvid. In support of the record, he embarked on a five-date South African tour.

Discography

Studio albums

References

Year of birth missing (living people)
Living people
People from Cape Town
South African musicians